Tristan Clemons is an Australian field hockey goalkeeper from Western Australia.

Personal
Tristan Clemons completed a PhD at the University of Western Australia in the School of Molecular Sciences. His thesis was titled, "Multifunctional nanoparticles for therapeutic delivery". The goal of his research is to develop various nanoparticles that could treat injuries of the central nervous system and could help treat diseases like cancer. He is part of the BioNano Research Group at the University of Western Australia, School of Molecular Sciences.

Business
In 2015, Tristan Clemons along with his wife, established a hat company named 'Get Flapped'. The company produces legionnaire hats designed to be both stylish and practical. The business promoted a message of sun smart awareness and collaborated with a number of charities and local artists to develop unique designs on the hats. After moving to the United States in early 2019, Clemons sold the company to new management. Tristan is also a qualified marriage celebrant as 'Marry me Clemo' where he conducted civil ceremonies for friends and family.

Field hockey
In 2009, he played for the Western Australian Thundersticks in the Australian Hockey League. He was in goal for his team's 4–2 win over Tasmania in a game in March. It was his first season with the team. He continued to play for them in 2010 and 2011. In 2010, his team finished the season in fourth place.

National team
In 2011, he played in goal for Australia during the Lanco International Super Series 9s, where Australia won 4–1 in a game against India, with Sardar Singh scoring against Clemons. In November 2011, he was part of the Australia men's national field hockey team that played in the four nations tournament in Perth, Western Australia. The competition was his international debut at a competition that inaugurated new goal widths.

In December 2011, he was named as one of fourteen players to be on the 2012 Summer Olympics Australian men's national Olympic development squad. While this squad is not in the top twenty-eight and separate from the Olympic training coach, the Australian coach Ric Charlesworth did not rule out selecting from only the training squad, with players from the Olympic development having a chance at possibly being called up to represent Australia at the Olympics. He trained with the team from 18 January to mid-March in Perth, Western Australia.

References

Australian male field hockey players
Living people
Year of birth missing (living people)
Field hockey people from Western Australia